Arthur Procter may refer to:

 Arthur Herbert Procter (1890–1973), English recipient of the Victoria Cross
 Arthur Thomas Procter (1886–1964), lawyer, judge and politician in Saskatchewan, Canada